Joel Owen Latibeaudiere (born 6 January 2000) is a professional footballer who plays as a defender for EFL Championship club Swansea City. Born in England, he represents the Jamaica national team.

Club career

Manchester City
Latibeaudiere joined Manchester City at the age of thirteen but did not make a senior appearance at the club. He captained City's under-18s to the Premier League North title, and was part of the side that reached the FA Youth Cup final. He went on loan to FC Twente for the 2019–20 Eredivisie season, where he made five appearances and scored once.

Swansea City
In October 2020, Latibeaudiere joined Swansea City on a three-year contract. He scored his first goal for the club in an EFL Cup tie against Reading on 10 August 2021.

International career
Born in England, Latibeaudiere is of Jamaican descent. He was a member of the side that finished runners up to Spain at the 2017 UEFA European Under-17 Championship and missed a penalty in the final. In October 2017 he was included in the squad for the 2017 FIFA U-17 World Cup and played the full game in the final as England defeated Spain to lift the trophy.

He was called up to the Jamaica national team in May 2022. He made his debut in a 6–0 friendly defeat to Catalonia on 25 May.

Career statistics

Honours
England U17
FIFA U-17 World Cup: 2017
UEFA European Under-17 Championship runner-up: 2017

References

2000 births
Living people
Footballers from Doncaster
Jamaican footballers
Jamaica international footballers
English footballers
England youth international footballers
English sportspeople of Jamaican descent
Association football defenders
Manchester City F.C. players
FC Twente players
Swansea City A.F.C. players
Eredivisie players
English Football League players
English expatriate footballers
Black British sportspeople